Rice High School or  Altair Rice is a public high school located near the community of Altair, Texas (USA) and classified as a 3A school by the UIL. It is a part of the Rice Consolidated Independent School District located in southeastern Colorado County. The school is the result of the consolidation of high schools in Eagle Lake, Garwood and Sheridan. In 2015, the school was rated "Met Standard" by the Texas Education Agency.

Athletics
The Rice Raiders compete in the following sports:

 Baseball
 Basketball
 Cross Country
 Football
 Golf
 Powerlifting
 Softball
 Tennis
 Track & Field
 Volleyball

State Titles
Boys Basketball  - 
1981(3A)
Girls Track - 
1984(3A)
2016 boys cross country state runner up: Ryan Trahan

References

External links
Rice Consolidated ISD website

Public high schools in Texas
Schools in Colorado County, Texas